Arthur Kingsland Wheelock Jr. (born May 13, 1943, in Uxbridge) is an American art historian, who served as Curator of Northern Baroque Paintings at the National Gallery of Art in Washington, D.C. until retiring in 2018. Wheelock also teaches as a professor of art history at the University of Maryland.

Early life and education
The son of Arthur, former president of Stanley Woolen Mill, and Ann Kneass, Wheelock grew up in Uxbridge and graduated from Phillips Exeter Academy in 1961. His father's side is descendant from Ralph Wheelock, attributed to be the forerunner of founding public education in the United States. Wheelock then received a Bachelor of Arts in art history from Williams College in 1965 and was part of the Delta Upsilon fraternity. He then went on to receive a Doctor of Philosophy from Harvard University in 1973. Wheelock's dissertation was titled "The Shifting Relationship of Perspective to Optics and its Manifestation in Paintings by Artists in Delft around 1650." In 2018, he received the honorary degree of Doctor of Arts from Dickinson University.

Career
Wheelock began his career in museums as a David E. Finley Fellow at the National Gallery of Art in 1973 and later was also named Research Curator, under director J. Carter Brown. He also commenced teaching at the University of Maryland, where he has held the post of Professor of Art History. Wheelock was appointed Curator of Dutch and Flemish Painting at the National Gallery two years later, which eventually led to his appointment as Curator of Northern Baroque Paintings. He has lectured widely on Dutch and Flemish art and has authored several publications on the subjects.

Awards and honors
Knight of the Order of Orange-Nassau (1982)
College Art Association Award for Distinction in Scholarship and Conservation (1993)
Williams College Bicentennial Medal (1996)
Commander of the Order of Leopold (2006)
Art Libraries Society of North America George Wittenborn Memorial Book Award (2014)
Williams College Kellogg Award (2015)

Personal life
Wheelock married Susan Hoffman on June 13, 1964, with whom he had three children: Laura, Matthew, and Tobey. They divorced in 1988. On August 24, 1991, Wheelock married Perry Carpenter Swain.

See also
List of Delta Upsilon brothers
List of Phillips Exeter Academy people
List of people from Uxbridge, Massachusetts
List of Rembrandt connoisseurs and scholars
List of University of Maryland, College Park people
List of Williams College Bicentennial Medal winners
List of Williams College people

References

External links
National Gallery of Art profile

1943 births
Living people
People from Uxbridge, Massachusetts
Historians from Massachusetts
Phillips Exeter Academy alumni
Williams College alumni
Harvard University alumni
American art curators
American art historians
Johannes Vermeer scholars
Scholars of Dutch art
Scholars of Netherlandish art
Rembrandt scholars
University of Maryland, College Park faculty
Knights of the Order of Orange-Nassau
Order of Leopold (Belgium)